Ernst Heinrich Paul Albert Wigand (October 21, 1882 – December 18, 1932), known as Albert Wigand,  was a German university professor, physicist, and meteorologist.

Biography
Albert Wigand was born in Kassel, then part of the Prussian Province of Hesse-Nassau, to Dr. Paul Wigand, a Catholic Apostolic clergyman, and his wife Luise (née Thiersch; September 12, 1856 – April 23, 1919). He was a descendant of two old families of theologians and natural philosophers; his paternal grandfather (and namesake) was the botanist, pharmacologist and staunch creationist Albert Wigand, and his maternal grandfather was the philologist and theologian H. W. J. Thiersch. Through his father he was descended from the evangelical theologian Johann Jakob Pfeiffer and the jurist Friedrich Kulenkamp, and was a relative of Burkhard Wilhelm Pfeiffer, Louis Pfeiffer, Carl Jonas Pfeiffer, Franz Pfeiffer and Adolf von Deines. His mother’s relatives included her aforementioned father, her grandfather Friedrich Thiersch, and her uncles Karl and Ludwig Thiersch.

After completing his studies at Frankfurt-am-Main’s humanistic Lessing Gymnasium, Wigand studied natural sciences, mathematics, and philosophy from 1901 to 1906 at the Universities of Marburg and Munich. In 1906, he received the degree of Dr. phil. from the University of Marburg, where he completed his thesis  (On the temperature dependence of the specific heat of solid elements and on the specific heat and specific gravity of their allotropic modifications) under his advisor, Dr. Franz Richarz. In the same year, he also passed the state propaedeutical examination for university-level instructors of physics, mathematics, chemistry, mineralogy and philosophy. Wigand worked as an assistant to his advisor Richarz until 1907, at which point he was engaged as an assistant to Wilhelm Hallwachs in the physics department at the  Technische Hochschule in Dresden.

During the First World War, Wigand was wounded in combat, and was awarded the Iron Cross, 2nd class. After his injury, he was recommissioned as a lieutenant in the Luftstreitkräfte reserve, monitoring local weather conditions from the command center in Charlottenburg. It was also during this period that Wigand met and married Else von Hippel (August 21, 1895 - December 18, 1932), daughter of the eminent German ophthalmologist, Eugen von Hippel.

Wigand had achieved full professorship by 1917, and in 1921 he was working as an adjunct professor at Halle. At some point between 1917 and 1922, Wigand became acquainted with Albert Einstein, who was at the time the director of the Kaiser Wilhelm Institute for Physics. Einstein was instrumental in approving an institutional grant to support Wigand's research into aeronautics. This acquaintance led to a years-long correspondence between the two on matters of physics and their shared interest in the development of the science.

In early 1929, Wigand travelled to the United States, at the instigation of Albert Einstein, where he worked with Louis A. Bauer in the Department of Terrestrial Magnetism at the Carnegie Institution for Science. Soon after returning to Prussia, Wigand was invite by University of Hamburg to occupy the newly established Chair of the department of Meteorology, a continuation of the position once held by Alfred Wegener. Directorship of the University of Hamburg Meteorological Institute also entailed directing the 's Meteorological Experiment Station. On July 4, 1931, Wigand was appointed rector of the University of Hamburg for the period October 1, 1931 to September 30, 1932. Wigand's rectorship at the University of Hamburg proved to be his last important post, and he left a mark in that role. He was a staunch opponent of the Weimar Republic, and actively supported the nationalist and socialist elements within the student body. He was quoted as having described German politics as an "Augean stable" that needed cleansing from the "stain" of "foreign influence," and even took it upon himself to introduce classes in military science to the curriculum, promising to “lead his students into a riot with banners flying.” After his death in 1932, the student body presented the University with a bronze bust of Wigand at the 1933 Labor Day celebrations. For many years after, the bust was the site of gatherings of Nazi and Nazi-sympathizing students, which ultimately led to the toppling of the bust by student activists in 2007.

Published works
Wigand, A. (1908). Statik und Kinetik der Umwandlung im flüssigen Schwefel und die Schmelzwärme des monoklinen Schwefels. Zeitschrift für Physikalische Chemie, 63(1), 273-306.
Wigand, A. (1910). Der Zustand erstarrter Schwefelschmelzen. Zeitschrift für Physikalische Chemie, 72(1), 752-758.
Wigand, A. (1911). Die Löslichkeit des „unlöslichen “Schwefels. Zeitschrift für Physikalische Chemie, 75(1), 235-244.
Wigand, A. (1911). Die umkehrbare Lichtreaktion des Schwefels. Zeitschrift für Physikalische Chemie, 77(1), 423-471.

Wigand, A. (1919). Mesures de conductibilité électrique dans l'atmosphère libre jusqu'à 9000 mètres d'altitude. Le Radium, 11(7), 204-208.

Wigand, Albert. "Die vertikale Verteilung der Kondensationskerne in der freien Atmosphäre." Annalen der Physik 364, no. 16 (1919): 689-741.
Wigand, A. (1919). a Method of Measuring Visibility. Monthly Weather Review, 47(11), 808-808.
Wigand, A. (1921). Die elektrische Leitfähigkeit in der freien Atmosphäre, nach Messungen bei Hochfahrten im Freiballon. Annalen der Physik, 371(18), 81-109.
Everling, E., & Wigand, A. (1921). Spannungsgefälle und vertikaler Leitungsstrom in der freien Atmosphäre, nach Messungen bei Hochfahrten im Freiballon. Annalen der Physik, 371(20), 261-282.

Halle, A. S., & Wigand, A. (1925). Summary of atmospheric‐electric investigations during airplane flights. Terrestrial Magnetism and Atmospheric Electricity, 30(1), 33-34.
Wigand, A., & Kircher, K. (1927). Schnellwirkende luftelektrische Kollektoren. Gerlands Beitr. Geophys., 17, 379-379.
Wigand, A., & Wenk, F. (1928). Der Gehalt der Luft an Radium‐Emanation, nach Messungen bei Flugzeugaufstiegen. Annalen der Physik, 391(13), 657-686.
Die Atmosphäre als Kolloid (with August Schmauß), 1929.
Wigand, A., & Frankenberger, E. (1930). Stability and Coagulation of Mists and Clouds. Physik. Z, 31, 204-15.

References

1882 births
1932 deaths
19th-century German people
Scientists from Kassel
People from the Kingdom of Prussia
University of Marburg alumni